OSS 117 takes a vacation/Hot Holidays for OSS 117/OSS 117 prend des vacances is a French/Brazilian international co-production 1970 spy film directed by Pierre Kalfon who also co-wrote and co-produced the film.  It starred Luc Merenda, Edwige Feuillère and Elsa Martinelli. The film is one of the OSS 117 series of films, and was based on the 1968 novel Vacances Pour OSS 117  by Josette Bruce the widow of Jean Bruce who also co-wrote the film. The film was shot in Guarujá.

Plot
OSS 117 goes on holiday to Brazil, but is called into action when he finds himself being stalked by a double.

Production
The film was the result of an agreement between Pierre Kalfon and Walter Hugo Khouri.  Kalfon directed and Khouri produced the OSS 117 film whilst Khouri directed and Kalfron produced Khouri's The Palace of Angels that also featured Luc Merenda, Norma Bengell and Geneviève Grad.

Male model Luc Merenda made his debut in the film, at which time he was originally signed for five films, but he never returned to the role.

Cast
 Luc Merenda ...  Hubert Bonisseur de La Bath, alias OSS 117 
 Edwige Feuillère ...  Comtesse de Labarthe 
 Elsa Martinelli ...  Elsa 
 Geneviève Grad ...  Paulette Balestri 
 Norma Bengell ...  Anne 
 Ivan Roberto   
 Rossana Ghessa ...  Anna 
 Sérgio Hingst ...  Santovski 
 Tarcísio Meira ...  Killer 
 Jess Morgane ...  Balestri
 Yann Arthus-Bertrand ...  Yann 
 Jorge Luis Costa ...  Flavio 
 Almir de Freitas ...  Joao 
 Vittorio Rubello ...  Marcello

References

External links

1970 films
1970s spy thriller films
French spy thriller films
1960s French-language films
Brazilian thriller films
Films set in Brazil
Films shot in São Paulo (state)
Films based on French novels
French sequel films
1960s French films
1970s French films